Groupe Flammarion is a French publishing group, comprising many units, including its namesake, founded in 1876 by Ernest Flammarion, as well as units in distribution, sales, printing and bookshops (La Hune and Flammarion Center). Flammarion became part of the Italian media conglomerate RCS MediaGroup in 2000. Éditions Gallimard acquired Flammarion from RCS MediaGroup in 2012. Subsidiaries include Casterman. Its headquarters in Paris are in the building that was the former Café Voltaire (named in honour of the writer and philosopher Voltaire), located on the Place de l'Odeon in the current 6th arrondissement of Paris.

Flammarion is a subsidiary of Groupe Madrigall, the third largest French publishing group.

History 
Ernest Flammarion successfully launched his family publishing venture in 1875 with the Treaty of Popular Astronomy of his brother, the astronomer Camille Flammarion. The firm published Émile Zola, Maupassant, and Jules Renard, as well as Hector Malot, Colette, and a wide list of medical, scientific, geographical, and historical works, including also the Père Castor children's series.

Brands

See also 

 Café Voltaire
 Place de l'Odeon

References

External links 

 

Publishing companies of France
RCS MediaGroup
Visual arts publishing companies
Publishing companies established in 1876
French companies established in 1876